The hidden angelshark (Squatina occulta) is a species of angelshark that was named by Carolus Maria Vooren and Kleber Grübel da Silva in 1991. It inhabits the Atlantic coastline of South America from southern Brazil to Argentina. Hidden angel sharks grow up to 124 cm in length and are ovoviviparous, meaning the embryos develop inside eggs that remain inside the mother's body until they are ready to hatch.

Size

Differences
The hidden angelshark differs from other species of angelshark due to the size of its neurocranial measurements. Its rostral region is considerably short compared to its counterparts. Its neurocraniam is its widest at the outer corners of its nasal capsules and post-orbital processes. The hidden angelshark's configuration is very similar to that of a ray, the one major difference is the shark's gills, which lie edgewise of the head.

Residence
Although there are many speculations as to where this species resides, studies show they are found in Puerto Quequén, Necochea, Buenos Aires Province, Argentina.

References

Estalles, Maria Lourdes, et al. “The Southernmost Range Limit for the Hidden Angelshark Squatina Occulta.” Marine Biodevirsity Records, Esatalles, 1 Aug. 2016, link.springer.com/content/pdf/10.1186/s41200-016-0066-x.pdf.

hidden angelshark
Fish of Uruguay
Fish of the Western Atlantic
Taxa named by Carolus Maria Vooren
Taxa named by Kleber Grübel da Silva
hidden angelshark